The Turbomeca TM 333 is a turboshaft engine manufactured by French company Turbomeca and designed for helicopters weighing 4-5 tonnes. It first ran in August 1981 and was introduced commercially in the mid-1980s. It was the first Turbomeca engine to use a single stage turbine, making it more compact than its predecessors. In its original design, the engine was rated at 750 continuous horsepower, though it was designed to allow for future power increases, and the later 2B2 variant made 1,100 horsepower.

Variants
TM 333 2B2
 The TM 333 2B2 powered early versions of the HAL Dhruv, though it was replaced by the Shakti engine, which was jointly developed by HAL and Turbomeca.  
TM 333 2M2 
 The TM333 2M2 is used on the HAL Cheetal and Chetan, upgraded versions of the Cheetah and Chetak, respectively.

Applications
 HAL Dhruv
 HAL Cheetah 
 HAL Chetak

Specifications (TM 333 2M2)

See also

References

External links
 Turbomeca TM 333

TM 333
1970s turboshaft engines
Mixed-compressor gas turbines